The Magicians is a British family entertainment television show, first broadcast throughout January 2011 on BBC One. 

The show features magicians performing a number of magic tricks with guest celebrities, to decide which pair will face a forfeit trick at the end of the episode. In the first series, this was decided through audience participation; however, for the second series, a phone vote was introduced. The first series was hosted by Lenny Henry, and featured magicians Luis de Matos, Barry and Stuart and Chris Korn.

Series overview

Episodes

Series 1 (2011)
 Winner: Luis De Matos (3 wins)
 Runner(s)-up: Barry and Stuart (2 wins)
 Loser: Chris Korn (No wins)

Series 2 (2012)
 Winner: Jason Latimer (3 wins)
 Runner(s)-up: Barry and Stuart (2 wins)
 Loser: Pete Firman (1 win)

References

Lists of British children's television series episodes